Kelly Salmon (aka Kelly Natelle) (born 23 March 1987 in Harlow, Essex, United Kingdom) is an English actress and fashion model. She appeared in the first TV commercial for NSPCC in 1991. She later became a primary school teacher in Hertfordshire.

Early life

Salmon started modelling at a very young age and made her first commercial at the age of eleven months. She has modelled fashion in a number of different countries and on Blue Peter. She made her film debut in 1995 in Solitaire for 2, playing the young Katie, appearing in just the opening minute of the film. Her next screen role was far more substantial, appearing as Kate Spiller in the popular CBBC show Big Kids in 2000, alongside Imogen Stubbs, Duncan Duff and Matt Adams. It was a role that she is probably best known for, and brought her notice. Then came an appearance in London's Burning in 2001 (Series 13,Episode 14) where she played a Girl Guide caught up in an arson attack. After that came her second main role in the third series of The Ghost Hunter in 2002, playing Bex. Her last role to date was in Out of Bounds, a 2003 film starring a young Sophia Myles and Sophie Ward, in which Salmon played Phoebe Benallack.  As well as her appearances in film and TV, she has also appeared in a number of professional and amateur theatre productions, including Annie in the West End in 1998, when she played the part of Duffy and on the productions UK Tour, as 'Annie' in 2000. Her progress through the auditions of Annie in 1998 and parts of the subsequent show were shown on the BBC series 8:50 to Paddington Green. Her younger brother, Shaun, has appeared in Tiger Aspect's Murder, starring Julie Walters, and her younger sister, Hayley Marie, has appeared in the West End musical Spend Spend Spend and the UK Tour of Annie.

Education
In 1998 she attended the Sylvia Young Theatre School and attended Nottingham Trent University until 2008.

Filmography

External links
 

1987 births
Living people
English television actresses
People from Harlow
English female models
English stage actresses